Nawab Abul Quasim Owaisi, Mir Yousuf Ali Khan, Salar Jung III (1889–1949), commonly known as Salar Jung III, was a nobleman and art collector from Hyderabad Deccan (Hyderabad State). He served as Prime Minister of Hyderabad Deccan during the reign of the seventh Nizam, Mir Osman Ali Khan. In 1912, at the age of twenty-three, Salar Jung III succeeded Maharaja Sir Kishen Pershad as Prime Minister and served for two and a half years. He held the fourth-highest position among the Hyderabad Deccan nobility, below three members of the Paigah family.

His extensive art collection is now held in Hyderabad's Salar Jung Museum. .

Family

Salar Jung III's paternal family, the Salar Jung family, provided a number of Prime Ministers over five generations: Mir Alam Bahadur, Nawab Mir Ali Zman Khan Muneer ul Mulk, Nawab Mir Mohammad Ali Khan Shuja ud Dowla Salar Jung, Nawab Mir Turab Ali Khan, Salar Jung I, Nawab Mir Laiq Ali Khan Salar Jung II. Through his mother, Salar Jung III was the great-grandson of Nawab Syed Gulam Ali Khan, Mansoor-Ud-Dowla, the Nawab of Banaganapally and great-grandson of Nawab Syed Bahadur Ali Khan Karar Jung Mansoor ud Doula, Madar-Ul-Maham.

Personal life

Salar Jung III was passionate about collecting rare relics, artefacts, antiques and manuscripts, including illuminated Qurans. He is believed to have spent the lion's share of his money on his collection over a period of 35 years. The collection was exhibited privately at his family residence, Dewan Devdi, until its relocation in 1968 to the Salar Jung Museum, one of India's three national museums.

See also

 Salar Jung family
 Hyderabad Deccan

References

External links
 A feature
 One of India’s most influential and powerful statesmen of the 19th century, Sir Salar Jung I decisively shaped Hyderabad’s political and economic history for the three decades he was Diwan

Prime Ministers of Hyderabad State
Salar Jung family
Indian Muslims
1889 births
1949 deaths